John Owens may refer to:

John Owens (merchant) (1790–1846), English merchant
John Owens (Australian politician) (1809–1866), doctor and politician in Victoria, Australia
Johnny Owens (born 1977), Canadian drummer
John Owens (American football) (born 1980), American football tight end
John B. Owens (born 1971), American lawyer and federal appellate judge
John Owens (Gaelic footballer) (born 1966), Irish Gaelic footballer
John E. Owens (1824–1886), English-American comedian
John G. Owens (1865–1893), American archaeologist
John Sidney Owens (1893–1965), American pursuit pilot and World War I flying ace
John W. Owens (1884–1968), editorial writer on the Baltimore Sun

See also
Jack Owens (disambiguation)
John Owen (disambiguation)